Interferon regulatory factor 5 is a protein that in humans is encoded by the IRF5 gene. The IRF family is a group of transcription factors that are involved in signaling for virus responses in mammals along with regulation of certain cellular functions.

Function 

IRF5 is a member of the interferon regulatory factor (IRF) family, a group of transcription factors with diverse roles, including virus-mediated activation of interferon, and modulation of cell growth, differentiation, apoptosis, and immune system activity. Members of the IRF family are characterized by a conserved N-terminal DNA-binding domain containing tryptophan (W) repeats. Alternative splice variants encoding different isoforms exist. The regulatory and repression regions of the IRF family are mainly located in the C-terminal of the IRF.

A 2020 study showed that an adaptor protein named TASL play an important regulatory role in IRF5 activation by being phosphorylated at the pLxIS motif, drawing a similar analogy to the IRF3 activation pathway through the adaptor proteins MAVS, STING and TRIF.

Clinical significance 

IRF5 acts as a molecular switch that controls whether macrophages will promote or inhibit inflammation. Blocking the production of IRF5 in macrophages may help treat a wide range of autoimmune diseases, and that boosting IRF5 levels might help treat people whose immune systems are weak, compromised, or damaged. IRF5 seems to work "either by interacting with DNA directly, or by interacting with other proteins that themselves control which genes are switched on."

Signaling 
The IRF family regulates the gene expression for the interferon (IFN) response to viral infections. IRF5 is a direct transducer to interferon signaling and is activated via phosphorylation. The IRF family can also initiate the JAK/STAT signaling pathway by binding to transmembrane receptors that activate JAK. IRFs, IFNs, and the JAK/STAT signaling pathway work together to fight viral infections in mammals through specific signals.

See also
 Interferon regulatory factors

References

Further reading

External links 
 
 

Transcription factors